The Cattleman was a steakhouse in New York City founded in 1959 by restaurateur Larry Ellman. During its heyday, The Cattleman attracted media attention as an early example of a theme restaurant, and it became the inspirational basis for the musical Pump Boys and Dinettes.

History
In his twenties, Larry Ellman became the New York distributor for Automatique, a Danish firm that manufactured Wittenborg brand food-vending machines "similar in appearance and operation to the Automat." Proceeds from the sale of his business enabled him to pursue his first restaurant venture. The Cattleman opened at Lexington Avenue and East 47th Street in Manhattan, New York City, in 1959, with sales reaching $450,000 that year. By 1967, The Cattleman had relocated to 5 East 45th Street (the Fred F. French Building at 551 Fifth Avenue), with sales of over $4,000,000 a year at the 400-seat restaurant.

By 1972 at the latest, Ellman had additionally opened The Cattleman West at 154 West 51st Street, at Seventh Avenue. The restaurants closed circa 1989.

Starting in 1961, Ellman introduced sing-along sessions every evening from 9 p.m. until 2 a.m., led by Bill Farrell. As The New York Times described in 1967:

In 1964, publisher James Warren held the launch party for Creepy, the first horror-comics magazine of Warren Publishing, at The Cattleman.  By at least 1968, the restaurant offered "free stagecoach rides around the city" on Saturday and Sunday from 5 to 9:30 p.m.

A history of New York dining, On the Town in New York (1998), called the restaurant a "riotously successful steakhouse". In 1961, The Theatre magazine said it was "one of the best dining emporiums in New York."

Ellman announced in 1997 that he and partners Edward Buyes and William Opper planned to recreate The Cattleman at 1241 Mamaroneck Avenue in White Plains, New York, in November of that year.

Ellman's son, Kevin Ellman, played drums and percussion in singer-songwriter Todd Rundgren's 1973-1986 band Utopia, leaving it in 1975.

In media
In 1967, Grosset & Dunlap published the cookbook The Cattleman's Steak Book: Best Beef Recipes, a collaboration of the staff of Cattleman Restaurant, food writer Carol Truax, and writer S. Omar Barker. Ellman wrote the foreword. Playboy magazine printed the recipe for a house cocktail, the Cattleman's Cooler, "[f]rom the Cattleman, a Manhattan dining spot that calls itself an adult Western restaurant."

The musical Pump Boys and Dinettes (1981) was created by two friends who worked at The Cattleman, dramatizing their experiences there. It started as a two-man act there, and then expanded. As Jim Wann, the show's principal author and composer recalled in 2010,

The restaurant was known for the radio slogan "Where you can get your steak rare and entertainment well done."

The 1966 remake of the Western film Stagecoach did part of its publicity at The Cattleman, photographing some of its stars atop a stagecoach there.

A passage in Rupert Holmes' novel Where the Truth Lies involves the restaurant: "In Manhattan, theme restaurants were blooming like plastic flowers in winter. ... The Cattleman had set the stage, or rather the stagecoach, for such funhouse eateries, supposedly patterned after a Kansas City steer palace. ..."

References

External links
 American Express full-page ad for The Cattleman, with description of restaurant and image of its stagecoach, at  Retrieved on October 6, 2012.
  Retrieved on October 6, 2012.

Defunct restaurants in New York City
Restaurants established in 1959
1959 establishments in New York City
1989 disestablishments in New York (state)
Culture of New York City
Cuisine of New York City
Restaurants disestablished in 1989
Steakhouses in New York City
Defunct steakhouses in the United States